Nema or NEMA may refer to:

People
 Nema Andahadna (1939–2018), American priestess and occult writer

Places
 Nema (island), Federated States of Micronesia
 Néma, a town in Mauritania
 Néma (department), a department in Mauritania
 Nema (urban-type settlement), an urban-type settlement in Kirov Oblast, Russia

Science and technology
 NEMA connector, several standardized connectors
 NEMA enclosure types, for enclosing electrical service apparatus
 NEMA (machine), a Swiss cryptographic rotor machine
 Networked Environment for Music Analysis, a project for music information processing

Organisations
 National Early Music Association, UK
 National Electrical Manufacturers Association, US
 National Emergency Management Agency (New Zealand)
 National Emergency Management Agency (Nigeria)
 National Emergency Management Agency (South Korea)
 National Environment Management Authority of Kenya
 National Environment Management Authority of Uganda
 New England Museum Association, US
 Northeastern Midget Association, an American sanctioning body of midget car racing
 Diocese of the Northeast and Mid-Atlantic, a Reformed Episcopal Church diocese in the United States and Canada

Other uses
 NEMA (Chicago), a residential tower in Chicago, US
 Nema (community), Nimivanshi Rajput community in India
 NEMA (San Francisco), an apartment complex in San Francisco, US

See also
 Neman (disambiguation)
 Nima (disambiguation)